The following is the qualification system and qualified countries for the Roller sports at the 2019 Pan American Games competition held in Lima, Peru.

Qualification
A total of 56 roller sports athletes will qualify to compete. 16 will qualify in artistic and 40 in speed skating. The Pan American Championships for each discipline held in 2018 was used to determine the qualifiers.

Qualification timeline

Qualification summary

Figure
The top seven countries in each event qualified along with hosts Peru, who were given an automatic entrant into each event. A nation could enter a maximum one skater per event. A total of 16 quotas were available (eight per gender).

Speed
A total of 40 speed skaters qualified. Peru as host nation received the maximum quota allocation of four (two men and two women). The remaining 36 spots were allocated using the results of the Pan American Nations Championship held in Monterrey, Mexico in November 2018.

Peru entered only one female athlete.

References

P
Qualification for the 2019 Pan American Games
Roller sports at the 2019 Pan American Games